Melike Mama Hatun, or simply Mama Hatun, was a female ruler of the Saltukids, with its capital in Erzurum, for an estimated nine years between 1191 and 1200.

During her reign she had a caravanserai, a mosque, a bridge, and a hammam built in the town of Tercan, located midway between Erzincan and Erzurum, which are still standing and are named after her.

Her tomb - build by masters from Ahlat - is also in Tercan. The town itself was called Mamahatun until recently, and is still referred to as such locally. During her reign she built mosques, a medrese, several mekteps, shadirvans, caravanserais, and other types of Islamic architecture. She also built many hammams throughout her rule.

Mama Hatun also remains a vivacious figure in Turkish folk literature to this day.

See also 
 Anatolian beyliks

References

Sources 
 Sevim, Ali: Türk Tarihi – Fetih, Selçuklu ve Beylikler Dönemi, Türk Tarih Kurumu 1989; p207/208
 Dursun Ali Şeker, art. MAMA HATUN (ö. 597/1201'den sonra) Saltuklu melikesi (1191 - 1200), in İslâm Ansiklopedisine 27 (2003), p. 548.

Seljuk dynasty
History of Erzincan
History of Erzurum
12th-century women rulers
Turkic female royalty
12th-century Turkic women
Turkic rulers